KCOY-TV (channel 12) is a television station licensed to Santa Maria, California, United States, serving the Central Coast of California as an affiliate of the Spanish-language network Telemundo. It is owned by VistaWest Media, LLC, which maintains a shared services agreement (SSA) with the News-Press & Gazette Company (NPG), owner of Santa Barbara–licensed ABC/CBS affiliate KEYT-TV (channel 3) and Class A Fox affiliate KKFX-CD (channel 24). KCOY-TV and KKFX-CD share studios on West McCoy Lane in Santa Maria; KEYT-TV maintains separate facilities on TV Hill, overlooking downtown Santa Barbara. KCOY-TV's transmitter is located on Tepusquet Peak east of Santa Maria.

History
The station went on-the-air on March 16, 1964. KCOY would not have existed if it were not for the Federal Communications Commission (FCC)'s decision in 1959 to move KFRE-TV (channel 30, now KFSN-TV) in Fresno from channel 12 to channel 30 under pressure from politicians in the Central Coast. This allowed channel 12 to be used in Santa Maria. The station signed on as Santa Barbara County's NBC affiliate, sharing CBS with KEYT.

It was owned for more than a dozen years by Central Coast Broadcasters, who acquired the station on August 1, 1968, from the near bankruptcy of the original owners.  The consortium of local business people including Mili Acquistapace and Burns Rick, was headed by Helen Pedotti, who had previously not even owned a television set, but took personal interest in the operation of the station. The station took its current affiliation with CBS in 1969 with the consolidation of Santa Barbara and San Luis Obispo counties into a single market; KSBY in San Luis Obispo became the NBC affiliate for the newly-enlarged market. It was owned by Stauffer Communications from the early-1980s until 1995 when the company merged with Morris Communications. However, the FCC did not allow Morris to keep the former Stauffer television stations due to the agency's rules in effect at the time against newspaper-broadcast station cross-ownership which affected several of the Stauffer markets where Morris already owned newspapers. KCOY was sold along with most of its sisters to Benedek Broadcasting in 1996. Three years later, Benedek traded KCOY to the Ackerley Group for that company's KKTV in Colorado Springs, Colorado. In 2002, Ackerley was bought out by Clear Channel Communications (now iHeartMedia).

On April 20, 2007, Clear Channel entered into an agreement to sell its entire television stations group to Newport Television, a broadcasting holding company controlled by the private equity firm Providence Equity Partners. The sale was finalized on March 14, 2008. However, due to Providence Equity Partners' partial ownership of media properties which serve portions of the Santa Maria / San Luis Obispo market, KCOY and sister station KKFX-CA were resold to the Cowles Publishing Company with the group deal closing on May 7, 2008.

The station moved from 1503 North McClelland Street, which is now a church, to its current location in the late-1980s. KCOY was the hometown station in 2005 when it covered the trial of Michael Jackson since it was held at the Lewellen Justice Center in Santa Maria.

On September 20, 2013, News-Press & Gazette Company, owner of KEYT-TV in Santa Barbara, announced that it would take over some of KCOY's operations (including its news operation) under a shared services agreement. Sister station KKFX-CA, as well as Monterey sister stations KION-TV and KMUV-LP, were to be sold to NPG directly. The sale was completed on December 13. Almost immediately following consummation, the KCOY web site was folded into the KEYT web site. On December 26, Cowles composed a deal to sell KCOY to VistaWest Media, a company based in St. Joseph, Missouri (where NPG is also based); the station was to remain operated by NPG under a shared services agreement. The sale was completed on January 30, 2015.

The News-Press & Gazette Company announced on October 10, 2018 that it would be converting KSBB-CD to ATSC 3.0 operations, airing News Now in that format, with its own ATSC 1.0 signal and programming being moved to a subchannel of KEYT-TV.

On January 1, 2021, the CBS affiliation was moved to the secondary subchannel of ABC affiliated sister station KEYT-TV, with Dabl moving from KCOY-DT4 to KCOY-DT1.

On February 1, 2023, KCOY's main channel switched from Dabl to the Spanish-language Telemundo network.

News operation

KCOY produces its local newscasts both for the station itself and for sister station KKFX, totaling 30½ hours, with 5½ hours each weekday and 90 minutes on weekends. On weekdays, a two-hour morning newscast is shown at 5 a.m., with an additional hour over on KKFX since CBS Mornings is carried on KCOY. Half-hour blocks are broadcast at 5, 6, and a 35-minute wrap at 11 p.m.  On weekends there are half-hour newscasts at 6 and 11 p.m. Like rival KSBY, KCOY does not produce a midday newscast nor a weekend morning newscast.

Central Coast News This Morning airs weekdays from 5 to 7 a.m. on KCOY. Unlike most CBS affiliates in the Pacific Time Zone, KCOY does not air midday news during the week. In addition to the main studios, the station operates from a bureau in San Luis Obispo (on Pacific Street) and Santa Barbara (at the KEYT studios).

KCOY and KKFX broadcast their news in high definition starting in July 2011.

On January 6, 2012, the station announced that in an effort to cut costs, a round of layoffs was announced that included the elimination of the sports department, cutting its morning show to only one hour on weekdays, and having the evening newscasts to be based at the KION/KCBA studios. Layoffs included chief meteorologist Jim Byrne and sports anchor Kevin Roose, although weeknight anchor Arturo Santiago and sports anchor Dave Alley shifted to reporting duties. On May 5, 2014, KCOY resumed live newscasts, based out of KEYT in Santa Barbara.

Notable former on-air staff
Lee Cowan Reporter for NBC News, July 2007–present
Roger Hernandez (Former Weekend Weather anchor and currently Head Weather anchor at KTAS 33 Telemundo in Santa Maria, CA)
David Kerley (11 p.m. News and 6 p.m. Sports Anchor in the 1970s, now a Correspondent for ABC News)
David Lee (sports anchor 1990–1991)
Lon McEachern (Sports Anchor and Reporter in the early 1980s, now Poker Analyst for ESPN's World Series of Poker)
Scott Reiss (Sports Anchor 1997–2000; Currently at NBC Sports Bay Area)
Rick DeBruhl (Sports and News Anchor 1977–1978; Later covered motorsports for ESPN; Currently Motor Trend Group on-air talent)

Technical information

Subchannels
The station's digital signal is multiplexed:

Analog-to-digital conversion
KCOY-TV shut down its analog signal, over VHF channel 12, on February 17, 2009, the original target date in which full-power television stations in the United States were to transition from analog to digital broadcasts under federal mandate (which was later pushed back to June 12, 2009). The station's digital signal remained on its pre-transition UHF channel 19. Through the use of PSIP, digital television receivers display the station's virtual channel as its former VHF analog channel 12.

Translator

References

External links

Telemundo network affiliates
Laff (TV network) affiliates
Television channels and stations established in 1964
1964 establishments in California
COY-TV
News-Press & Gazette Company